The 1992 Pacific Tigers football team represented the University of the Pacific (UOP) in the 1992 NCAA Division I-A football season as a member of the Big West Conference.

The team was led by head coach Chuck Shelton, in his first year, and played home games at Stagg Memorial Stadium in Stockton, California. They finished the season with a record of three wins and eight losses (3–8, 2–4 Big West). The Tigers were outscored by their opponents 253–287 over the season.

Schedule

Team players in the NFL
The following UOP players were selected in the 1993 NFL Draft.

The following finished their college career in 1992, were not drafted, but played in the NFL.

Notes

References

Pacific
Pacific Tigers football seasons
Pacific Tigers football